Trioceros narraioca, the Mount Kulal chameleon or Mount Kulal stump-nosed chameleon, is a species of chameleon endemic to Kenya.

References

Trioceros
Reptiles described in 2003
Reptiles of Kenya